Seventeen Cavalry Reserve Regiments were formed by the British Army on the outbreak of the Great War in August, 1914. These were affiliated with one or more active cavalry regiments, their purpose being to train replacement drafts for the active regiments. In 1915, the 3rd Line regiments of the Yeomanry were also affiliated with the Cavalry Reserve and, in September 1916, the Household Cavalry Reserve Regiment was formed in Windsor, supplying replacements to the dismounted Household Battalion. In 1917, the regiments underwent major reorganization, being reduced to ten in number.

Although nominally cavalry, many of the drafts ended up being converted into infantry in order to satisfy the manpower demands of trench warfare.

Despite being training and not combat formations, several were involved in the putting down of the Easter Rising in Dublin in April 1916. A little after noon on Easter Monday, a mixed troop of 9th and 12th Lancers, attached to the 6th Cavalry Reserve Regiment at Marlborough Barracks in Phoenix Park, was dispatched to investigate a "disturbance" at Dublin Castle. As they cantered down Sackville Street, they were fired upon by rebels who had taken up positions in and on the roof of the General Post Office. Three troopers were killed instantly and one was mortally wounded, becoming the first military casualties of the rising. The same evening, 1,600 men of the 3rd Reserve Cavalry Brigade (consisting of the 8th, 9th and 10th Cavalry Reserve Regiments) arrived from their barracks at the Curragh to support the local Dublin garrison.

Original August 1914 Formations

Formed in 1916

After 1917 re-organization

Notes

References

Bibliography
 

Cavalry regiments of the British Army